Liquidity ratio may refer to:

 Reserve requirement, a bank regulation that sets the minimum reserves each bank must hold.
 Quick ratio (also known as an acid test) or current ratio, accounting ratios used to determine the liquidity of a business entity

In accounting, the liquidity ratio expresses a company's ability to repay short-term creditors out of its total cash. It is the result of dividing the total cash by short-term borrowings. It shows the number of times short-term liabilities are covered by cash. If the value is greater than 1.00, it means fully covered. 

The formula is the following:

LR = liquid assets / short-term liabilities

Liquidity ratios measure how quickly assets can be turned into cash in order to pay the company's short-term obligations. Following ratios can be considered to measure the liquidity of a firm.

 Working Capital
 Working Capital Ratio
 Current Ratio
 Quick Ratio
Absolute Liquid Ratio

See also

 Accounting liquidity
 Market liquidity